Aadolf Fredrik Svanström (3 December 1885 – 17 April 1959) was a Finnish middle-distance runner, who competed in the 1908 Summer Olympics in London.

Athletics

Olympics

Other 

He won the Finnish national championship gold in 1500 metres in 1907.

He broke a few Finnish records in middle-distance running, but only one of them was ratified:
 1000 metres with the time 2:38.2 in Braunschweig, German Empire, in 1907. However, before 1923 only races in Finland were ratified as national records.
 1500 metres, 4:22.0, Turku, 1 September 1907. Was ratified.
 Mile, 4:38.8, Stockholm, Sweden, 14 September 1907. Not ratified.
 1500 metres, 4:19.6, Stockholm, Sweden, 15 September 1907. Not ratified.

He was a German Hochschule track and field champion in 1500 metres in 1907–1909.

Career 

He completed his matriculation exam in Turku Swedish Real Lyceum in 1906. He graduated as a veterinary physician from the University of Veterinary Medicine Hanover in 1911.

He was the municipal veterinarian of Pargas from 1911 to 1918, when he was hired by the Finnish Defence Forces.

He made trips to import weapons for the White Guard in 1917–1918 and fought in the Finnish Civil War. He completed the veterinary officer's course in 1918. He was the chief of the remount section under the Ministry of Defence during the Winter War. He was the chief of the veterinary materiel office during the Continuation War.

He retired from the military with the rank veterinary colonel in 1945, and continued working as a foodstuff hygienist and an official veterinarian for a further 13 years.

Accolades 

He was made an honorary member of the Finnish Veterinary Association in 1951.

He received the following medals:
 Order of the Cross of Liberty, 4th class cross with swords
 First Class Knight of the White Rose of Finland
 Commemorative medal of the Liberation War

Family 

His parents were sea captain Gustav Adolf Svanström and Matilda Carolina Hallberg. His wife was Paula Hakulinen.

Sources

References

1885 births
1959 deaths
Athletes (track and field) at the 1908 Summer Olympics
Olympic athletes of Finland
Finnish male middle-distance runners
People from Pargas
Sportspeople from Southwest Finland